Rosawa is a village in Fatehpur tehsil of Sikar district of Rajasthan. It is located in west direction at a distance of about 15 km from Fatehpur.

External links
 Census 2001 Sikar District

Villages in Sikar district